L2 Syntactical Complexity Analyzer (L2SCA) developed by Xiaofei Lu at the Pennsylvania State University, is a computational tool which produces syntactic complexity indices of written English language texts. Along with Coh-Metrix, the L2SCA is one of the most extensively used computational tool to compute indices of second language writing development. The L2SCA is also widely utilised in the field of corpus linguistics. The L2SCA is available in a single and a batch mode. The first provides the possibility of analyzing a single written text for 14 syntactic complexity indices. The latter allows the user to analyze 30 written texts simultaneously.

Usage

Second language writing development
The L2SCA has been used in numerous studies in the field of second language writing development to compute indices of syntactic complexity.

Corpus linguistics
The L2SCA has also been used in various studies in the field of corpus linguistics.

Indices

Notes
 Note 1: Abbreviation

See also
Coh-Metrix

References

External links 
 

Computational linguistics
Applied linguistics
Second language writing